Alfred Theodore Tollner (born May 29, 1940) is a former American football player and coach. He had served as the head coach at the University of Southern California (USC) from 1983 to 1986 and San Diego State University (SDSU) from 1994 to 2001, compiling an overall college football record of 69–68–1. Tollner also was an assistant coach in the National Football League (NFL) for 15 seasons, including stints as offensive coordinator for the San Diego Chargers, San Francisco 49ers and Detroit Lions.

Playing career
Tollner attended California Polytechnic State University, where he was a quarterback on the 1960 team that suffered a plane crash in Toledo, Ohio in which 22 people of the 45 people on board were killed, including 16 of Tollner's teammates.

He was a member of the silver medal winning U.S. baseball team at the 1963 Pan American Games.

Coaching career

High school
Tollner's first coaching job was at Morro Bay High School. He served for a year there before moving on to Woodside High School where he worked one year as offensive coordinator before coming head coach.

College
Tollner then coached at College of San Mateo from 1968 to 1972. He served as the offensive coordinator for San Diego State under Claude Gilbert from 1973 to 1980. He also served as the quarterbacks coach at Brigham Young (BYU) in 1981.

He became offensive coordinator of the USC Trojans football program under head coach John Robinson in 1982, and succeeded to the head coaching position a year later when Robinson stepped down to take an administrative post at the university. During his four-year tenure Tollner compiled a 26–20–1 record. He led the Trojans to the Pacific-10 conference championship in 1984. That team defeated Ohio State in the 1985 Rose Bowl game. He was replaced as the USC head coach by Larry Smith after the 1986 season after going 1–3 in the UCLA–USC rivalry and 0–4 vs. Notre Dame in the Notre Dame–USC rivalry.

In 1994, he returned to San Diego State, this time as the head coach. He coached there for eight years.  Tollner was known for scheduling a tough non-conference schedule including schools like Washington, Wisconsin, USC, Arizona, Arizona State and Oklahoma. His Aztec teams posted eight-win seasons in 1995 and 1996, the first time it reached that level in consecutive years since 1977. In 1998, his Aztecs posted a 7–1 conference record (7–5 overall), grabbed a share of the conference championship, and earned a trip to the Las Vegas Bowl. Overall, he led the Aztecs to a 43–48 record until his firing in 2001.

NFL
Tollner served as the wide receivers coach for the Buffalo Bills from 1987 to 1988. He served as the offensive coordinator for the San Diego Chargers from 1989 to 1991.  He served as the quarterbacks coach for the Los Angeles Rams from 1992 to 1993. In 2002, he then became the quarterbacks coach for the San Francisco 49ers. After two successful seasons, he was promoted to offensive coordinator in 2004. When Dennis Erickson was fired as head coach, he was not retained. In 2005, he became the offensive coordinator of the Detroit Lions. When Steve Mariucci and several of his assistants were fired 11 weeks into the season, Tollner was demoted to tight ends coach for the remainder of the season.

In late 2006, he was listed as a potential candidate for the  head coaching opening for the University of San Diego that later went to Ron Caragher.

In late 2007 it was announced that he would serve as offensive assistant for the San Francisco 49ers in a late season attempt to revive the lacking offense.  In early 2008 Tollner was named quarterbacks coach/assistant to the head coach for the San Francisco 49ers to get a permanent role in the organization again.  On December 30, 2008, Tollner was dismissed from the 49ers along with running backs coach Tony Nathan and offensive coordinator Mike Martz.

On February 4, 2009, Tollner was introduced as a part of the Oakland Raiders' coaching staff as he was named the passing game coordinator of the team. When Hue Jackson was hired as the Raiders head coach he dismissed Tollner and several others from their positions.

In 2011, Tollner announced his retirement from coaching.

Head coaching record

References

1940 births
Living people
American football quarterbacks
Buffalo Bills coaches
BYU Cougars football coaches
Cal Poly Mustangs football players
Detroit Lions coaches
Los Angeles Rams coaches
National Football League offensive coordinators
Oakland Raiders coaches
San Diego Chargers coaches
San Diego State Aztecs football coaches
San Francisco 49ers coaches
USC Trojans football coaches
High school football coaches in California
Baseball players at the 1963 Pan American Games
Pan American Games medalists in baseball
Pan American Games silver medalists for the United States
Medalists at the 1963 Pan American Games
Players of American football from San Francisco